Glaphyria is a genus of moths of the family Crambidae.

Species
Glaphyria acutalis 
Glaphyria albifascialis (Hampson, 1912)
Glaphyria amazonica 
Glaphyria argentipunctalis (Amsel, 1956)
Glaphyria badierana (Fabricius, 1794)
Glaphyria basiflavalis 
Glaphyria cappsi 
Glaphyria citronalis (Druce, 1899)
Glaphyria cymalis 
Glaphyria decisa (Walker, 1866)
Glaphyria distictalis (Hampson, 1912)
Glaphyria dolatalis 
Glaphyria flavidalis (Hampson, 1912)
Glaphyria fulminalis (Grote, 1878)
Glaphyria glaphyralis Guenée, 1854
Glaphyria himerta 
Glaphyria leucostactalis (Hampson, 1912)
Glaphyria matanzalis (Schaus, 1920)
Glaphyria micralis 
Glaphyria moribundalis 
Glaphyria ochrofusalis (Amsel, 1956)
Glaphyria oriola (Dyar, 1914)
Glaphyria peremptalis 
Glaphyria polycyma 
Glaphyria potentalis 
Glaphyria pupillalis (Möschler, 1886)
Glaphyria rufescens (Hampson, 1912)
Glaphyria semiferrealis 
Glaphyria sesquistrialis Hübner, 1823
Glaphyria spinacrista Solis & Adamski, 1998
Glaphyria spinasingularis Solis & Adamski, 1998
Glaphyria stellaspina Solis & Adamski, 1998
Glaphyria tanamoalis (Schaus, 1920)
Glaphyria tetraspina Solis & Adamski, 1998
Glaphyria tripunctalis (Amsel, 1956)
Glaphyria xanthoperalis

References

Glaphyriini
Crambidae genera
Taxa named by Jacob Hübner